El Yunque is a  mountain located  west of Baracoa and the Baracoa Bay in Cuba's Guantanamo Province. It has a table mountain shape that resembles an anvil ("yunque" in Spanish).

Overview
El Yunque was mentioned by Christopher Columbus in his chronicles about the discovery of the Americas.

El Yunque was declared a National Monument by the Cuban National Commission of Monuments on December 25, 1979.
El Yunque is covered with Cuban moist forests and the lower slopes are planted with cocoa bean under the shade of groves of royal palm.

Gallery

References

External links

Mountains of Cuba
Geography of Guantánamo Province